The Massacre in the Rue Haxo was a massacre of priests and gendarmes by communards during the semaine sanglante ("bloody week") at the end of the Paris Commune in May 1871.

Background

The communards associated the Catholic Church with conservatism and imperialism and enforced a separation between Church and state.

In April, the Commune had arrested some 200 clergy to serve as hostages against reprisals from the Versailles government, and to use in possible prisoner exchanges. In particular, leaders of the Commune hoped to be able to exchange the archbishop of Paris, Georges Darboy, for Louis Auguste Blanqui, but this offer was rebuffed by Adolphe Thiers, president of the Third Republic. Versailles troops entered the city on 21 May, and by 24 May had retaken much of the city. Théophile Ferré signed an order of execution for six of the hostages at la Roquette Prison, specifically including the archbishop; they were executed by firing squad.

Massacre
On 26 May, 50 further hostages from la Roquette Prison were executed, this time publicly in rue Haxo.

On 27 May, some of them attempted to escape; they were immediately killed.

In total, 110 were killed, of whom 75 were clergy and 35 were soldiers.

Legacy 
A chapel was built on the site in 1894, and in 1938 the church in rue Haxo was inaugurated as Notre-Dame des Otages.

On 25 November 2021, the Vatican recognized five victims of the 26 May killings as martyrs: Henri Planchat, Ladislas Radigue, Polycarpe Tuffier, Marcellin Rouchouze, and Frézal Tardieu.

References

Further reading
 Massacre: The Life and Death of the Paris Commune

1871 in France
1870s in Paris
Massacres in 1871
Massacres in France
Paris Commune
Communism-based civil wars
Massacres of Christians